Aurand Harris (1915–1996) is the most produced playwright for young audiences in the United States. Over six decades he wrote more than 50 plays, many of which became classics in the children's play repertory. His play, "Androcles and the Lion", is said to be the single most-produced play in the field, surpassing even "Peter Pan" and "The Wind in the Willows." First staged Off-Broadway in 1963, the play remains Anchorage Press' top seller and it was estimated at the time of his death in 1996 to have been performed on over 30,000 occasions. The plays of Aurand Harris have been produced and applauded in thousands of productions around the world for nearly a half-century. Harris was a prodigious dramatist, writing a newly published play each season. He was a tireless experimenter of forms, themes, and subjects. This modest man of irrepressible imagination and energy carried a vast array of honors and accolades. He was the first recipient of a National Endowment of the Arts Creative Writing Fellowship in Children's Theatre. He received an honorary doctorate from Indiana University and was inducted into the College of Fellows of the American Theatre. He was the first playwright to receive the Medallion of the Children's Theatre Foundation of America.  Aurand Harris died on May 6, 1996, in Manhattan, New York.  He is buried in the family plot in Jamesport, Missouri.

Early life
"James Aurand Harris, the only child of Myrtle Sebastian and Dr. George Dowe Harris, was born on July 4, 1915, in Jamesport, Missouri. His father was a physician; his mother, a graduate of Northwestern University, was trained in theater and speech, and was also an active and well-know director, teacher, and amateur actress who maintained her own studio.  From an early age, Aurand Harris was drawn to things theatrical, no doubt in part due to his mother's influence, but also because of the variety and high quality of the theater with which she surrounded him.

Harris' acting career began at age four when he played a bumblebee in a local musical production; before seven, he had written his first "little dramatic piece." His education was augmented with speech, dance, and musical train.  In high school, he was involved in dramatic and oratorical contests, to the extent that when he graduated, he was named 'the best actor and the best orator in the state of Missouri.'"

Education
In 1936 he obtained Bachelor of Arts from the University Kansas City. In 1939, he obtained a Master of Arts from Northwestern University in Evanston, Illinois, where he worked with Winifred Ward, a pioneer in children's theatre. Then he made postgraduate studies at Columbia University (1947). In 1991 he obtained his Doctor of Humane Letters (honorary) from Indiana University. Thomas Ehrlich, the 15th President of the Indiana University, presented the honorary degree.
 
He commenced his teaching career in September 1939 at Horace Mann High School Gary, Indiana, as a studio teacher for dramatics.  He taught there for two years. In September 1941, he served as the Head of the Drama Department at William Woods College, in Fulton, Missouri. In 1946, he relocated to New York City to study writing for the theater. Simultaneously, he commenced a teaching position at Grace Episcopal Church School in Manhattan. He remained in this position for 33 years.

Initially, he was interested in adult theater, but after setbacks in that field, he turned his attention to writing for children, having already written several children's plays in his younger years.

Aurand Harris's first play was Once Upon a Clothesline. The first production of Once Upon a Clothesline was performed by the Campus Players of William Woods College, under the direction of the author, Aurand Harris.Once Upon a Clothesline was a prize-winning play in the Second Annual Seattle Junior Programs Playwriting Contest. This production featured the intermediate group of sixth, seventh and eighth-grade students from the 1951 Seattle Summer Theatre Workshop, performing in the Recital Hall at the Palisades Building in Balboa Park. This play would later go on tour at playgrounds throughout the city. Later, the play was performed on July 27–28, 1951, at the San Diego Junior Theater, directed by Signe Culbertson and assisted by James Sams.

In 1964, Aurand Harris wrote Androcles and the Lion, his best-known work. His play educates the audience about commedia dell'arte while providing entertainment.  The play is funny and joyful, with an essential message about freedom and love. It was translated into ten languages and was, for a time, the most produced play of any American playwright for children. In 1976 he became the first children's playwright to receive a National Endowment for the Arts Creative Writing Fellowship. In 1985 he was inducted into the College of Fellows of the American Theater; the ceremony took place at the Kennedy Center in Washington. In 1988 he directed one of his plays at Shanghai Children's Art Theater. It was the first time a western children's play had been performed for Chinese children.

He also co-edited several anthologies of plays for children and adolescents. They include Short Plays of Theatre Classics, selected and edited by Aurand Harris. New Orleans, Louisiana: Anchorage Press, 1991; Six Plays for Children by Aurand Harris, including, Biography and Play Analyses. Edited by Coleman A. Jennings. Austin: University of Texas Press, 1977; and Plays Children Love: A Treasury of Contemporary and Classic Plays for Children.
Edited by Coleman A. Jennings and Aurand Harris. New York: Doubleday & Co., 1981.

Aurand Harris' obituary ran in the Los Angeles Times and the New York Times.,

Honors and awards 

1967: Charlotte B. Chorpenning Playwright Award, American Alliance for Theatre and Education 

1976: First Recipient of the National Endowment for the Arts Creative Writing Fellowship in Children's Theatre 

1985: Charlotte B. Chorpenning Playwright Award, American Alliance for Theatre and Education (AATE)

1985: Inducted into the College of Fellows of the American Theatre, presented at the Kennedy Center, Washington, D.C.

1991:  Recipient of the Distinguished Play Award, American Alliance for Theatre and Education (AATE), for Monkey Magic: Chinese Story Theatre, by Aurand Harris, published by Anchorage Press 

1991: Honorary Doctorate of Letters, Indiana University, Indianapolis, May 12, 1991

1993: Medallion, Children's Theatre Foundation of America (now called the Orlin Corey Medallion)

1993: Recipient of the Distinguished Play Award, American Alliance for Theatre and Education (AATE), for The Pinballs, Adapted by Aurand Harris from the award-winning novel by Betsy Byar, published by Anchorage Press 

1996: Recipient of the Distinguished Play Award, American Alliance for Theatre and Education (AATE), for The Prince and the Pauper, Adapted for the Stage by Aurand Harris, published by Anchorage Press

Plays/Works

Once Upon a Clothesline, Row-Peterson & Company, now Samuel French, Inc. (1945).  The premiere performance of Once Upon a Clothesline was presented by the College Players, of William Woods College, Fulton, Missouri, December 1943 and directed by Aurand Harris.

Ladies of the Mop, Baker's Plays, Samuel French, Inc. (1945).

The Moon Makes Three, Samuel French, Inc. (1947).

Madam Ada, Samuel French, Inc. (1948).

Seven League Boots, Baker's Plays (1948).

The Doughnut Hole, Samuel French, Inc. (1948).

Missouri Mural, Unpublished, (1948).

Circus Day:  A Play in Four Scenes, Samuel French, Inc. (1949)

Lo and Behold, Unpublished, (1949).

Junket (No Dogs Allowed), Children's Theatre Press (now Anchorage Press) (1949). 
A play adapted by Aurand Harris from the novel by Anne H. White.

Pinocchio and the Indians, Samuel French, Inc. (1950). 
A dramatization suggested by Pinocchio in Africa by Cherubini.

And Never Been Kissed, Samuel French, Inc. (1950). 
A musical play based on a 1949 novel by Sylvia Dee (pen name for songwriter Josephine Moore Proffitt), which was adapted by Aurand Harris into a comic television drama for the Philco Television Playhouse and stage play the following year.

Young Alec, Unpublished, (1950).

Simple Simon (or Simon Big-Ears), Children's Theatre Press (now Anchorage Press) (1953)
Adapted by Aurand Harris. Premiered in Washington, D.C., in 1952.

We Were Young That Year (A Play), Samuel French, Inc. (1954).

Buffalo Bill, Anchorage Press (1954). 
Adapted by Aurand Harris. Premiered in Seattle, Washington, 1953.

Hide and Seek, Unpublished (1955).

The Plain Princess, Anchorage Press, (1955). 
Adapted by Aurand Harris from the book by Phyllis McGinley.

The Flying Prince, Anchorage Press (1958). 
Based on stories told by Vikramaditya of Ujjain, a Hero of India.

Circus in the Wind (revised edition of Circus Days), Samuel Franch, Inc. (1960)

'Pocahontas, Anchorage Press (1961). 
Playscript developed from history by Aurand Harris.The Brave Little Tailor, Anchorage Press  (1961). 
A Dramatization by Aurand Harris based on the Brothers Grimm Fairy Tale.Androcles and the Lion, Anchorage Press (1964)Rags to Riches, Anchorage Press (1966). 
Playscript developed by Aurand Harris from stories by Horatio Alger. Musical score by Glenn Mack.Pinocchio and the Fire-Eater, McGraw-Hill (1967).  This play premiered on the stage Gary, Indiana Public School, Indiana 1940. Directed by Aurand Harris.A Doctor In Spite of Himself, Anchorage Press (1968). 
Adapted by Aurand Harris from Moliere.Punch and Judy: The Musical, Anchorage Press (1970)Just So Stories, Anchorage Press, (1971). 
Adapted by Aurand Harris from three of Rudyard Kipling's Just So Stories.Ming Lee and the Magic Tree, Samuel French, Inc (1973)Peck's Bad Boys, Anchorage Press (1974).  
Adapted by Aurand Harris based on stories by George Wilbur Peck. The premiere performance of Peck's Bad Boy was presented by the Harwich Junior Theater, West Harwich, Massachusetts, 24 July 1973 and directed by Aurand Harris.Star-Spangled Salute: A Patriotic Musical with Traditional American Songs, Anchorage Press (1974). First premiered at the Harwich Junior Theater, West Harwich, Massachusetts, Summer, 1974.Robin Goodfellow, Anchorage Press (1976). 
Adapted from English Folk tales and Shakespeare's "A Midsummer Night's Dream." First produced at the Harwich Junior Theater, West Harwich, Massachusetts, Summer 1975 and directed by Aurand Harris.Simple Simon, Anchorage Press (1976)Yankee Doodle Dandies, Anchorage Press (1976).
Three Scenes from Yankee Doodle Dandy.A Toby Show, Anchorage Press (1978)Ralph Roister Doister (One-Act Play), Baker's Plays, Samuel French, Inc. (1979). 
Adapted by Aurand Harris based on the 16th Century Play by Nicholas Udall.Edmond Rostand's Cyrano de Bergerac(One-Act Play), Baker's Plays, Samuel French, Inc. (1979). 
Adapted and abridged as a one-act play by Aurand Harris based on the novel written by Edmund Rostand.The Romancers (One-Act Play), Baker's Plays, Samuel French, Inc. (1979)
Adapted and abridged as a one-act play by Aurand Harris based on the work written by Edmund Rostand.Fashion (A Play in One-Act), Baker's Plays, Samuel French, Inc. (1979)
Adapted and abridged as a one-act play by Aurand Harris based on the novel written by Anna Cora Mowatt.George Bernard Shaw's Classic Candida: a Pleasant Play (One-Act Play), Baker's Plays, Samuel French, Inc. (1979). 
Adapted and abridged as a one-act by Aurand Harris based on the play by George Bernard Shaw.Arkansaw Bear, Anchorage Press (1980). 
The first premiere of the play was March 20–29, 1980, at the University of Texas, Austin.Treasure Island, Anchorage Press (1983),
Adapted from the novel by Robert Louis Stevenson.The Magician's Nephew: A Musical for the Young, Dramatic Publishing (1984). 
Adapted from the book by C.S. Lewis.Ride a Blue Horse, Anchorage Press (1986). 
From the life and works of James Whitcomb Riley.Huck Finn's Story, Anchorage Press (1987). 
Adapted by Aurand Harris based on selected scenes from Mark Twain's classic, The Adventures of Huckleberry Finn.Monkey Magic: Chinese Story Theater, Anchorage Press (1990). Winner of the 1991 AATE Distinguished Play Award.The Importance of Being Earnest, Anchorage Press (1991). 
Adapted by Aurand Harris from the play by Oscar Wilde.The Tricks of Scipan, Anchorage Press (1991). 
Adapted by Aurand Harris from the play by Molière.She Stoops to Conquer, Anchorage Press, (1991). 
Adapted by Aurand Harris from the play by Oliver Goldsmith.The Pinballs, Anchorage Press (1992). 
Adapted by Aurand Harris from the award-winning novel by Betsy Cromer Byars.     
Premiere Production: Premiered at Northwestern University Department of Drama. Winner of the 1993 AATE Distinguished Play Award.Steal Away Home, Anchorage Press (1992).  
Adapted by Aurand Harris from the novel by Jane Kristof, music by Carolyn Geer.The Second Shepherd's Play, Anchorage Press (1993).  
Adapted by Aurand Harris based on the medieval play Secunda Pastorum.Peter Rabbit and Me, Anchorage Press (1994).  
A dramatization of Beatrix Potter's beloved The Tale of Peter Rabbit.The Prince and the Pauper, Anchorage Press (1995). 
Playscript adapted by Aurand Harris based on the stories from Mark Twain. Music by Steve Wheaton. Winner of the 1996 AATE Distinguished Play Award. The Orphan Train, Anchorage Press (1998). Premiered at Northwestern University in Evanston, Illinois.A Midsummer Night's Dream'', Dramatic Publishing Company.
Adapted by Aurand Harris from the play by William Shakespeare.

Legacy
Aurand Harris' legacy lives on forever through the joy, excitement and magical words created through his children's plays. In addition, he is remembered through the award of grants and fellowships and the Aurand Harris Memorial Playwriting Award.

- Aurand Harris Children's Theatre Grants and Fellowships, Sponsored by the Children's Theatre Foundation of America 
Mr. Harris generously left all his play royalty revenues to the Children's Theatre Foundation of America. The Aurand Harris Grants and Fellowships "seek to inspire and challenge theatre for young audiences and individual artists, "To develop quality ideas and new opportunities in theatre for young audiences, as well as promote live theatre experience of high integrity for young people throughout the nation by supporting both individual theatre artists seeking to deepen and expand artistic capacities and opportunities through fellowship funding and by supporting theatre for young audience companies seeking to bring engaging live theatre to their respective communities."

- Aurand Harris Memorial Playwrighting Award, New England Theatre Conference
This playwrighting award was created in 1997 by the New England Theatre Conference to honor the late Aurand Harris (1915-1996) for his lifetime dedication to all aspects of professional theatre for young audiences.

References

1915 births
1996 deaths
20th-century American dramatists and playwrights
American male dramatists and playwrights
20th-century American male writers